PGA Championship Golf 2000 is a golf simulation game for Windows. It was developed by Headgate Studios and released by Sierra Sports. It follows PGA Championship Golf 1999 Edition. An upgraded version was released in December 2000, under the title PGA Championship Golf Titanium Edition.

Gameplay
The game features 13 courses, including 8 from PGA Championship Golf 1999 Edition. Features of the game include tour play, and several versions of play used to score golf including match play and stableford. There is a community of players who visit Golf Sim Clubhouse to discuss the game on a forum and meet up to play online. Over 1,600 user created courses are also available for download and designers can upload new courses to the site.

Development and release
PGA Championship Golf 2000 was developed by Headgate Studios and published by Sierra Sports. It is an upgraded version of its predecessor, with improvements focusing on various aspects such as game physics and the TrueSwing. Each of the courses from the previous game received graphical updates for the 2000 edition, except for the Jocassee Shoals course. For the Course Architect, new structures were added, including additional bridges, walls, and buildings, as well as more trees and other objects. Other changes include new camera modes.

Brian Silvernail designed the game's Canaveral Dunes course. Silvernail was well known for his online golf course designs, which he would create using the course designers that came with the Jack Nicklaus  games. Despite the title, the game does not include any professional PGA golfers. The development team had looked into licensing professional golfers for the game, but determined that players were more interested in other game features. The development team had a significant amount of work to do on the game and had a limited schedule to achieve it.

The game was announced in March 2000. Sierra began searching for beta testers in April 2000, and announced the completion of the game on May 9, 2000. The game was released in North America in June 2000, and a patch was released two months later. An upgraded version with seven new courses, titled PGA Championship Golf Titanium Edition, was released in December 2000. It was followed by PGA Championship Golf Collector's Edition, announced in June 2001 and scheduled for release later that year.

Reception

PGA Championship Golf 2000 has a score of 88 percent on GameRankings. Tom Ham, writing for The Washington Post, stated "the scenery here is top-notch--but the spectators still look like cardboard cutouts."

References

External links 
 Official website (archived)

Sierra Entertainment games
Golf video games
2000 video games
Windows games
Windows-only games
Video games developed in the United States